Ksawerów is a neighborhood in the Mokotów district of Warsaw, Poland.

Neighbourhoods of Mokotów